Can You Wave Bye-Bye? is a Canadian short drama film, directed by Sarah Galea-Davis and released in 2007. An adaptation of the short story by Elyse Gasco, the film stars Miranda Handford as a young new mother suffering from post-partum depression.

The film premiered at the 2007 Toronto International Film Festival. It was subsequently screened at the CFC Worldwide Short Film Festival in 2008, where it won the award for Best Canadian Short Film. It was a Genie Award nominee for Best Live Action Short Drama at the 29th Genie Awards, and a Prix Jutra nominee for Best Short Film at the 10th Jutra Awards.

References

External links
 

2007 films
Films based on short fiction
2007 drama films
2007 short films
2000s English-language films
Canadian drama short films
2000s Canadian films